Heliophanus pygmaeus is a jumping spider that lives in Senegal, Tanzania, South Africa and Zimbabwe.

References

Salticidae
Spiders of Africa
Spiders of South Africa
Fauna of Senegal
Arthropods of Tanzania
Arthropods of Zimbabwe
Spiders described in 2000